The following outline is provided as an overview of and topical guide to education:

Education is the process of facilitating learning, or the acquisition of knowledge, skills, values, morals, beliefs, habits, and personal development.

Participants in education 
 Student
 Parent (via parenting) – students' parents typically play a large role in teaching their children and overseeing their formal education, often including financing it.
 Teacher
 Teacher's assistant
 Tutor
 Head teacher (Principal)
 Professor
 Assistant professor
 Associate professor
 Adjunct professor
 School counselor
 School psychologist
 Principal (academia)
 Rector
 Dean
 Chancellor

History of education 
 History of education
 :Category:History of education by country
 History of early childhood care and education
 History of academia
 History of higher education

Educational philosophies 

 Idealism
 Realism
 Theism
 Pragmatism
 Existentialism
 Critical theory
 Perennialism
 Classicism
 Essentialism
 Critical pedagogy
 Waldorf education
 Democratic education
 Progressivism
 Unschooling
 Criticism of schooling
 Contemplative education
 Humanistic education
 Critical thinking
 Constructivism
 Behaviorism
 Cognitivism
 Popular education
 Montessori education
 Compulsory education

Educational theory and practice 
 Educational theory
 Instructional theory
 Learning theory

Pedogagical and instructional approaches 

 Alternative education
 Instructional design
 Learning environment
 Learning space
 Learning community
 Learning styles
 Socialization

Teaching methods 

 Collaborative learning
 Context-based learning
 Design-based learning
 Direct instruction
 Experiential education
 Experiential learning
 Homework
 Inquiry-based learning
 Kinesthetic learning
 Learning by teaching
 Online learning community
 Open learning
 Open classroom
 Outdoor education
 Personalized learning
 Problem-based learning
 Problem-posing education
 Project-based learning
 Service-learning
 Slow education
 Single-sex education
 Student-centred learning
 Taxonomy of Educational Objectives (Bloom's Taxonomy)

Educational materials, tools and technologies 
 Curriculum
 Educational technology (the use of electronic educational technology is also called e-learning)
 Educational animation
 Educational robotics
 Outline of open educational resources
 Instructional materials
 Lesson plan
 Textbook

Types of educational goals and outcomes 
There are many types of potential educational aims and objectives, irrespective of the specific subject being learned. Some can cross multiple school disciplines.
 Outline of educational aims

Educational assessment, qualification and certification (for students) 
 Educational assessment
 Educational measurement
 Psychometrics
 Types of test
 Test by purpose
 Formative assessment
 Diagnostic assessment
 Assessment as learning
 Summative assessment
 High-stakes testing
 Accountability assessment
 Research
 
 Standardized test
 Assessment by way of comparison
 Norm-referenced test
 Criterion-referenced test
 Ipsative test
 Assessment by mode
 Paper-based
 Oral
 Electronic
 Performance
 Continuous observation
 Assessment by format
 Essay
 Multiple choice
 Quiz
 Portfolio
 Practical considerations
 Grading in education
 Grade (education)
 Grading systems by country
 List of primary and secondary school tests
 School leaving qualification
 List of secondary school leaving qualifications
 List of admission tests to colleges and universities

Educational qualifications (for teachers) 
Teaching credential
 Bachelor of Education
 Master of Education
 Doctor of Education

Branches of education

Education by level or stage

 Early childhood education
 Primary education
 Secondary education
 Higher education
 Vocational education
 Tertiary education
 Academy
 Adult education

Education by funding and governance
 Public education
 Private education
 Homeschooling
 Autodidacticism

Education by subject, specialization or department
 List of education by subject
 List of academic disciplines

Educational scholars and researchers 
 :Category:Educational personnel
 :Category:Educators
 :Category:Educators by discipline
 :Category:Educational administrators

 :Category:Education writers
 :Category:Educational theorists
 List of educational psychologists
 :Category:Educational psychologists
 :Category:Historians of education
 :Category:Philosophers of education
 :Category:Educational researchers
 :Category:Education activists

Educational research 
 Educational research
 List of education journals
 Disciplinary approaches to educational research. Whereas much educational research is interdisciplinary and can focus on any topic on this page, some disciplines have long roots.
 Anthropology
 Measurement
 Assessment
 Comparative
 Curriculum studies
 Economics
 Educational sciences
 Gender
 International education
 Law and rights
 Leadership
 Management
 Neuroscience
 Policy
 Politics
 Process evaluation
 Psychology
 Sociology
In addition, research methods are drawn from many social research and psychological fields.

Educational organizations

Types of educational institutions 
 School – an institution designed for the teaching of students (or "pupils") under the direction of teachers. Most countries have systems of formal education (commonly compulsory), in which students progress through a series of schools. The names for these schools vary by country but generally include primary school for young children and secondary school for teenagers who have completed primary education. Non-compulsory higher education follows, and is taught in institutions called a college or university.

Specific schools 
 List of schools
 Lists of universities and colleges

Associations 
 Students' union
 Parent-Teacher Association
 International Association of Universities

Governmental organisations and agencies 
 Department of Education
 Board of education
 UNESCO

Libraries 
 Library – collection, or institution that provides a collection, of sources of information and similar resources, made accessible to a defined community for reference or borrowing. Among its purposes is to support the ongoing education of its members.

Types of libraries 

 Academic library
 Archive
 Digital library
 National library
 Public library
 Research library
 Special library

Specific libraries 
 List of libraries
 List of national libraries

Museums 
 Museum – an institution, the purpose of which is collect, preserve, interpret, and display items of artistic, cultural, or scientific significance for the education of the public.

Types of museums 

 Archaeology museum
 Art museum
 Biographical museum
 Children's museum
 Design museum
 Encyclopedic museum
 Historic house museum
 History museum
 Living history museum
 Maritime museum
 Medical museum
 Memorial museum
 Mobile museum
 Natural history museum
 Open-air museum
 Science museum
 Virtual museum
 War museum
 Living museum
 Zoological park
 Botanic garden

See also

 :Category:Lists of education lists
 Glossary of education-related terms
 Index of education articles
 Outline of second-language acquisition
 Outline of academia

References

External links

international review of curriculum and assessment framework a very useful website that provides comparative information about the education system of many countries.
 World Bank Education
 UNESCO - International Institute for Educational Planning
 UNESCO IBE Database: Information on almost every education system in the world
 The Encyclopedia of Informal Education

Learning
 
Wikipedia outlines